Al-Dhihar is a sub-district located in Al Dhihar District, Ibb Governorate, Yemen. Al-Dhihar had a population of  124621 as of 2004.

References 

Sub-districts in Al Dhihar District